Johann Heinrich Tobler (1777–1838) was a Swiss singer and composer of Appenzell Ausserrhoden, active in the formative period of Switzerland as a federal state.
Born in Trogen as the son of a butcher, he worked as Modelstecher (craftsman of artistic wooden Lebkuchen templates) in Speicher from 1792, from 1798 also as secretary to the local authorities. He married Ursula Lerchenmeyer in 1803, and Anna Katharina Lindenmann in 1820.

He was a musical autodidact and became known as a composer and editor of song collections, a publicist and a poet. One of compositions is Herrlich Leben strömt aus Dir.

In 1823, he was co-founder of the first cantonal fire insurance.  He founded a literary association in 1820, in which he presided from 1825-27 and 1835–37, in 1824 he founded the cantonal choir (Sängerverein).

In 1813, he also published a treatise of the early modern history of his home canton since partition from Appenzell Innerrhoden in 1597.

Bibliography
Lieder im gesellschaftlichen Kreise zu singen, 1807 (extended ed. 1828).
 Kurze Regenten- und Landesgeschichte des Kanton Appenzell der äusseren Rhoden, inner den Jahren 1597 bis 1797, 1813 
 Landsgemeinde-Lieder, 1835 
 Zwölf Lieder für vier Männerstimmen,   1837

References
 
 A. Tunger,  Johann Heinrich Tobler, 1989

Swiss composers
Swiss male composers
People from Appenzell Ausserrhoden
1777 births
1838 deaths